Dzyanis Kavalewski (born 2 May 1992) is a Belarusian footballer who plays for Rogachev.

External links
 
 
 Profile at Dinamo Minsk website

1992 births
Living people
People from Orsha
Sportspeople from Vitebsk Region
Belarusian footballers
Belarus under-21 international footballers
Association football defenders
FC Slavia Mozyr players
FC Dinamo Minsk players
FC Dynamo Brest players
FC Belshina Bobruisk players
FC Minsk players
FC Znamya Truda Orekhovo-Zuyevo players
FC Dnepr Rogachev players
Belarusian Premier League players
Belarusian First League players
Russian Second League players
Belarusian expatriate footballers
Expatriate footballers in Russia
Belarusian expatriate sportspeople in Russia